Superman is a 1980 Indian Telugu-language superhero film directed by V. Madhusudhana Rao. It stars N. T. Rama Rao and Jaya Prada, with music composed by Chakravarthy. The film is produced by R. Gopal under the Lakshmi Vishnu Productions banner. It is based on the DC Comics character of the same name. The film met with negative reviews.

Plot 
The film begins with Raja the son of Zamindar Raghunath Rao, who is an advent devotee of Lord Hanuman. Once, on the eve of Hanuman Jayanthi, Raghunath Rao offers their heritage jewelry to the Lord. Parallelly, 3 blackguards Maharaj, Sardar, and Jaisingh slaughter Raja’s parents along with the temple priest and snatches it. Thus, Raja makes a penance when Lord Hanuman bestows him supernatural powers and he turns into Super Man. Plus, he takes care of the priest’s family as his own. As of today, his foster mother Sarada detects and oaths not reveal his strength. Years roll by, and Raja always utilizes his power to aid the public but hides his identity. He undertakes the mining business with a partner Bangariah and falls for his daughter Jaya. The 3 traitors are still conducting anti-social activities. Initially, Raja butchers Jaisingh. After that, Maharaj identifies gold stones in the mine, of which they are unbeknownst. Hence, to squat it they create a threat of demons in that region. Anyhow, Raja counterstrikes it and wipes out Sardar. In the interim, Raja's sister Lakshmi loves a guy, Mohan stunningly, the son of Maharaj, and becomes pregnant. Here Raja decides to knit them. Maharaj is acquainted with Raja in disguise takes his share as dowry, and absconds with Mohan. Now Lakshmi attempts suicide, Raja protects her giving an assurance to bring Mohan back. Being cognizant of their presence in Hong Kong, Raja moves. Meanwhile, Bangariah & Jaya also reach there to sell the remaining mine due to the luring of Maharaj who seizes them and Jaya escapes when Raja safeguards her. Simultaneously, Maharaj tries to kill Raja but in vain. Ultimately, he sends a sorceress Lee who uses her black magic but she too is destroyed. At last, Raja recognizes Maharaj as the 3rd traitor, so, he eliminates him also, brings back Mohan, and performs his marriage with Lakshmi. Finally, the movie ends on a happy note with the marriage of Raja & Jaya.

Cast 
N. T. Rama Rao as Raja
Jaya Prada as Jaya
Satyanarayana as Maharaj Dharma Rao
Allu Ramalingaiah as Bangaraiah
Kanta Rao as Raghunatha Rao
Tyagaraju as Jai Singh
Chakarapani as Mohan
Arja Janardhan Rao as Lord Hanuman
Srilanka Manohar as Sardar
Pandari Bai as Sarada
Geetha as Lakshmi
Annapurna as Annapurnamma
Jayamalini as Lee

Music 
Music was composed by Chakravarthy.

References

External links 
 

1980s Indian superhero films
Film superheroes
Films directed by V. Madhusudhana Rao
Films scored by K. Chakravarthy
Indian fantasy action films
Indian superhero films
Unofficial Superman films
1980s Telugu-language films